Kuipers v Gordon Riley Transport, 1 C.C.L.T. 233 (1976) was a Canadian personal injury case involving negligence, standard of care, causation, and hindsight.

Background 

On 29 January 1972, Albertan newspapers including the Edmonton Journal and the Red Deer Advocate reported that a young boy had sustained serious injuries following a car crash south of Red Deer the previous day (28 January 1972). The following week the Lacombe Globe reported on the incident as well. Four years later when the injuries were addressed in court, the multi-vehicle collision was described in more detail. An initial collision between two vehicles in a whiteout area led both drivers to stop southbound on Alberta Highway 2. When a third vehicle driven by plaintiff Gerhardus Kuipers approached the site of the collision, it was forced to stop. A semi-trailer truck operated by Gordon Riley Transport subsequently entered the whiteout area and violently struck Kuipers' vehicle from the rear. Other collisions resulted and Alberta Supreme Court Justice Samuel Sereth Lieberman stated that the incident came to involve a total of eight vehicles.

Trial and verdict 
Kuipers claimed against all drivers of the other vehicles; however, Lieberman only advanced the charge against the Gordon Riley Transport vehicle that had struck the Kuipers vehicle. The case was settled in Kuipers' favour and the family was awarded a total of $124,077.09 CAD in damages.

In Lieberman's final judgment, he cited Teno v Arnold (1974) stating that "in Teno v. Arnold, supra, the Ontario Court of Appeal disagreed with Chief Justice McGillivray's view that the figures to be used in assessing damages for pain suffering and loss of amenities were arbitrary or conventional. That Court, however, accepted the principle that awards for similar injuries should be comparable." Lieberman cited Teno v Arnold when explaining his assessment of damages.

Impact 
Kuipers v Gordon Riley Transport has received judicial notice and has been followed variously in the Supreme Court of Prince Edward Island, the Supreme Court of British Columbia, and the Court of Queen's Bench of Alberta.

Negligence and standard of care 
The majority of cases that cite Kuipers v Gordon Riley Transport reference Lieberman's discussions of negligence and standard of care. Beginning in 1980, four years after Lieberman had delivered judgement, Justice Kenneth R. MacDonald judged MacKinnon v Hashie, stating "I must determine liability for damages suffered by the plaintiff. The approach which I must follow in a case such as this has been succinctly stated by Lieberman J. in Kuipers et al. v Gordon Riley Transport." MacDonald subsequently quoted Lieberman as follows:

Lieberman followed this by quoting Edward Alderson: "Negligence is the omission to do something which a reasonable man, guided upon those considerations which ordinarily regulate the conduct of human affairs, would do, or doing something which a prudent and reasonable man would not do." Therefore Lieberman's judgment considered the standard not to be one of perfection, but "an objective standard based upon the conduct of a reasonable driver in a particular set of circumstances." Lieberman's discussion of negligence has been similarly quoted by Justice Alexander B. Campbell in Matheson v Coughlin (1989), by Arthur M. Lutz in Jones v Green (1993) and by Armand DesRoches in Gordon Ferguson v MacLeod (2000). 

Kuipers v Gordon Riley Transport has been historically associated with a number of Albertan personal injury lawsuits from the 1970s that were argued on negligence principles as opposed to the English tort of public nuisance. In his paper "Divergence and Convergence in the Tort of Public Nuisance," Jason W. Neyers compares and contrasts the legal history of Canada and England, and the ways in which personal injury lawsuits have been argued alternately on negligence principles and on the tort of public nuisance: 

Neyers subsequently cites Kuipers v Gordon Riley Transport as an exemplary case when stating that after Abbott v Kasza, "Alberta courts consistently decided these issues using negligence principles" as opposed to the tort of public nuisance.

Causation and hindsight 
Although the majority of cases that cite Kuipers v Gordon Riley Transport refer to Lieberman's discussion of negligence and standard of care, the lawsuit has also appeared in Canadian case law with reference to the Lieberman's discussions of causation and hindsight. In Woitas v Tremblay (2018) Justice Roderick P. Wacowich cited Kuipers v Gordon Riley Transport for Lieberman's dismissal of the plaintiff's suggestion that "the actions of the other drivers established a 'chain of causation' leading up to the collision involving the plaintiff." Lieberman countered the chain of causation hypothesis by stating the following: 

When Justice Barry M. Davies delivered judgment in Oliverius v British Columbia (1999), he cited Kuipers v Gordon Riley Transport, stating "in assessing whether a driver has acted reasonably and prudently in the circumstances facing that driver, care must be taken to avoid standards of perfection based upon hindsight." The same discussion of "standards of perfection based upon hindsight" was cited by British Columbia Supreme Court Justice Robert W. Jenkins in Penner International v Basabara Estate (2013).

Notes

References

External links 
Kuipers v Gordon Riley Transport (1967) Ltd. 1976 CarswellAlta 69, [1976] A.J. No. 408, 1 C.C.L.T. 233

Alberta case law
Canadian tort case law
1976 in Canadian case law
1976 in Alberta
Traffic collisions
History of Alberta
Personal injury